Nocardiopsis umidischolae is a species of bacteria. It produces methanol-soluble toxins that paralyse the motility of boar spermatozoa. Its type strain is 66/93T.

References

Further reading
Whitman, William B., et al., eds. Bergey's manual® of systematic bacteriology. Vol. 5. Springer, 2012.

Sobolevskaya, M. P., et al. "Fatty-acid compositions of marine isolates of the actinobacteria Nocardiopsis umidischolae KMM 7036 and Streptomyces sp. KMM 7210." Chemistry of Natural Compounds (2012): 1–2.

External links
LPSN

Type strain of Nocardiopsis umidischolae at BacDive -  the Bacterial Diversity Metadatabase

Actinomycetales
Bacteria described in 2002